St. Thomas' Church, Nottingham was a Church of England church on Park Row in Nottingham between 1873 and 1926.

History

The building was erected by Wesleyan Methodists led by Richard Mercer, bookseller. The foundation stone was laid on Park Row on 5 June 1854. The chapel opened in April 1855 and was known as 'The Wesleyan Congregational Free Church'. and also Mercer's Chapel.

It was purchased by the Church of England in 1873 and alterations were made by Thomas Chambers Hine. It was known as the Episcopal church of St. Thomas and was consecrated by the Rt. Revd. Christopher Wordsworth the Bishop of Lincoln on 22 April 1873.

A full history of the church can be found on the Southwell and Nottingham DAC Church History Project.

List of incumbents
1873–1884 Walter Senior
1884–1888 Thomas Cleworth
1888–1894 Joseph Halloran
1894–1907 Martin Read
1907–1926 Charles Davis

Organ

A 2-manual organ was installed in 1882 by Charles Lloyd and Co.

List of organists

W.Telford Cockrem ca 1882
Henry Houseley 1882–1888
Frederick George Ainsworth Wyatt 1888–1918 (then organist of All Saints' Church, Nottingham)
Cecil T Payne 1918 – 1926

Closure

The church was merged with St. Matthew's Church, Talbot Street in 1926 and the building was demolished in 1930.

References

Former Church of England church buildings
Demolished buildings and structures in Nottingham
Nottingham St. Thomas
Organizations disestablished in 1926
Buildings and structures demolished in 1930